Joseph Nourse (London, England, 16 July 1754 – Washington D.C., 1841) was the first United States Register of the Treasury whose career spanned forty years and six presidential administrations. He played a key role in administering the finances of the new Republic.

Nourse first served during the American Revolutionary War as military secretary to General Charles Lee. He returned for a short time to his family's farm in Berkeley County, Virginia (now West Virginia). He settled in Philadelphia in 1779, where he served as assistant auditor general for the Board of Treasury.  He was elected register in 1781, where he assumed responsibility for keeping the financial records and accounts of the new government. He also authenticated each piece of Continental currency by personally signing it.

In 1800, he moved with the federal government from Philadelphia to the Washington, D.C. He purchased a residence at 3101 P Street in Georgetown. In 1804, he acquired Cedar Hill, now known as Dumbarton House, where he lived until 1813.

As Register of the Treasury, he worked closely with four administrations and early political leaders of the new nation.

When Andrew Jackson was elected president in 1829, Nourse was forced from office. A Congressional investigation claimed that Nourse owed the government $11,769.13 due to misappropriation of funds. Nourse countered that the government owed him for "uncompensated services". A Federal circuit court awarded him about $23,582, but it was seven years after his death until his heirs were able to collect.

References

1754 births
1841 deaths
United States Department of the Treasury officials
People from Georgetown (Washington, D.C.)